Get Away from Me is the debut studio album by American singer-songwriter Nellie McKay. The album was met with widespread praise from critics, and charted on the Billboard 200.

Release
The album was released on February 10, 2004, by Columbia Records. McKay insisted on Columbia releasing this album as a two-disc set even though all of its content could fit on a single disc. On iTunes, a clean version was made available which removes the profanities found on some of the songs like "Sari."

A DualDisc version of the album was released on March 29, 2005, featuring a DVD side with a live concert, 5.1 audio, and two previously unreleased tracks, "John-John" and "Teresa."  The CD side features both discs of the previous release as one continuous album.

"David," the album's opening track, was released as a promotional single, with an accompanying music video. The song was included on MTV2's "Shortlist 2004 Nominees" compilation and on the soundtrack for the TV series Weeds. McKay stated in an interview with ELLEgirl that the song was written about her neighbor, whom she has a crush on.

Critical reception

Get Away from Me was met with widespread praise from music critics. On the review aggregator Metacritic, the album holds a score of 79 out of 100, based on 17 reviews. Heather Phares, reviewing the album for AllMusic, gave the album 4 out of 5 stars, commenting that the album "is the kind of feverishly inventive, sprawling album that only comes from young artists," going on to praise the album's musical and lyrical eclecticism but feeling that the variety made the album sometimes feel "dizzying rather than dazzling." Phares concluded that the record "could become a cult favorite among pissed-off girl-women of McKay's age." In a rave review, The Guardians Maddy Costa, who awarded the album 5 out of 5 stars, felt that "lyrically [...] her elegance and control are irrefutable" and singled out "I Wanna Get Married" and "Won't U Please B Nice" as highlights. Entertainment Weekly, whose review was also extremely positive, likened McKay to Julie London and praised her vocals and lyrics, giving the album an "A".

Some critics were less enthusiastic in their assessments of the album. Chris Dahlen, writing for Pitchfork, gave the album 6.3 out of 10, calling McKay "annoying" and her music "a mess of jazz, pop, and easy listening," but praising the record's "graceful melodies, barbed hooks, and confident voice" on songs such as "Ding Dong" and "The Suitcase Song." The Austin Chronicles Matt Dentler was also more skeptical of the album, awarding the album 2 stars and criticizing some of McKay's lyrics, but feeling that McKay has "talent" and concluding that McKay will "only get better as she figures out who the real Nellie McKay is."

Commercial performance
Get Away from Me debuted at number 16 on the Billboard Heatseekers album chart on the chart dated March 13, 2004. The following week, the album rose to its number 7 peak on the Heatseekers chart and debuted on the Billboard 200 at number 181. The album remains her highest-charting album in the US, her only other album to reach the Billboard 200 being her Doris Day tribute album, Normal As Blueberry Pie.

Track listing
All songs written by Nellie McKay.Get Away From Me album booklet
Disc 1
"David" – 2:47
"Manhattan Avenue" – 3:38
"Sari" – 3:27
"Ding Dong" – 3:11
"Baby Watch Your Back" – 3:28
"The Dog Song" – 3:04
"Waiter" – 4:15
"I Wanna Get Married" – 4:01
"Change the World" – 3:58

Disc 2
"It's a Pose" – 3:30
"Toto Dies" – 4:02
"Won't U Please B Nice" – 2:09
"Inner Peace" – 2:53
"Suitcase Song" – 2:33
"Work Song" – 4:08
"Clonie" – 1:56
"Respectable" – 4:07
"Really" – 3:56

Personnel
Adapted from the liner notes of Get Away From Me and AllMusic.InstrumentsJay Berliner – Spanish guitar
Cenovia Cummins – violin, fiddle
Patricia Davis – violin
Joyce Hammann - violin
Paul Holderbaum - orchestra director
Jim Hynes - flugelhorn, trumpet
Birch Johnson - trombone
Billy Kaye - drums
Richard Locker - cello
Nellie McKay - chimes, glockenspiel, organ, percussion, piano, recorder, vibraphone, synthesizer, xylophone
Emily Mitchell - harp
Norman Panto - accordion
Charles Pillow - flute, alto saxophone
Carol Pool - violin
Ari Roland - upright bass
Rob Shaw - violin
Andy Snitzer - clarinet, tenor saxophone
Andy Stein - violin
Corin Stiggall - electric bass
Jade Synstelien - guitar
Belinda Whitney-Barratt - concertmasterProductionStuart Breed - assistant engineer
Greg Calbi - mastering
Geoff Emerick - engineer, producer
Steve Genewick - assistant engineer
Nellie McKay - associate producer
Bill Airey Smith - assistant engineerMiscellaneous'
Timothy Dark - rap consultant
Phillip Stewart - rhythm consultant
Elinda Whitney - contractor
Amy T. Zielenski - photography

Charts

References

Nellie McKay albums
2004 debut albums
Albums produced by Geoff Emerick
Columbia Records albums